The Kolochin culture was an Iron Age culture which flourished in western Russia from the 5th to the 7th century. It was the eastern element of the Prague-Penkov-Kolochin cultural complex. 

The Kolochin culture is attested by a hundred sites, most of which are situated along the Dnieper drainage. These settlements were undefended and composed of small single-roomed houses. Burials were by cremation. 

The culture has been identified either Balts and Slavs. The presence of Baltic river names in the area has lent support to the former theory. People living to the south of the Kolochin culture are however believed to have been Slavs. The Kolochin culture appears to have had relations with these Slavs to their south, and this may have been a source for linguistic exchanges between Baltic and Slavic languages.

Source

 

Archaeological cultures in Russia
Baltic archaeological cultures
Iron Age cultures of Europe